Port-Gentil or Mandji is the second-largest city of Gabon, and it is a leading seaport. It is the center of Gabon's petroleum and timber industries. The city is located on a delta island in the Ogooue delta with no bridges to the mainland. Nearby Cape Lopez is Gabon's westernmost point. As of 2013 census, it had a population of 136,462.

History 
In 1473, the Portuguese navigator Lopo Gonçalves sailed near Cape Lopez. In 1722, pirates led by Bartholomew Roberts fought a battle in the Cape Lopez Bay against the Royal Navy. The encounter ended in Roberts' death. The settlement was established on Mandji Island in the delta of the Ogooué River by the French, who signed a treaty with the Orungu people in 1873. It was used as a base for the expeditions of de Brazza into the interior, then in 1894 a customs post was set up, becoming the nucleus of a trading center that included Hatton & Cookson, John Holt, Woermann, Société du Haut-Ogooué, and Compagnie d'Exploitations Forestières Africaines. The main products were initially rubber and ivory, gradually supplemented by woods, particularly okoumé for plywood.

The town was named after the French colonial administrator Émile Gentil in 1900. After World War I it became a port for timber, but it grew rapidly only after Elf began oil exploration in the area. It received its first bank branch when Bank of West Africa (BAO) opened a branch there in 1928.

The city was the location of the exile of Moroccan nationalist leader Allal al-Fassi who resided in the city between 1937 and 1946.

A 1947 population of 4,500 grew to 21,000 by 1960. An oil refinery was established by SOGARA in the 1960s, with natural gas added in 1968.

The town is now known for its hotels and its nightlife, while attractions include the St Louis Church (built in 1927), a zoo, a casino, beaches and a golf course, as well as the wildlife in local swamps.

City districts
The city centre lies next to the harbour on the Port-Gentil Bay seaside. Hotels, banks, shops, and supermarkets (such as the Casino and Cecado brands) and the Casino de Port-Gentil are found within the downtown area between the Avenue Savorgnan de Brazzaville and the seaside. The area also concentrates a residential compound for foreign workforce. In the southern part, the BEAC building lies next to the port. The western Atlantic seaside is scarcely populated, mainly due to the presence of strong winds and sea currents. As is the case with other cities in Gabon, the authorities have not yet implemented house numbering in Port-Gentil, and the use of postal boxes is common.

Climate
The Köppen-Geiger climate classification system classifies Port-Gentil's climate as tropical wet and dry (Aw). Port-Gentil features a lengthy wet season that runs from October through May and a relatively short dry season that covers the remaining four months.

Transportation

Port Gentil is technically on an island, and no bridge connects it to the mainland. The limited number of paved roads within the city are also poorly maintained. The roads are paved in the inner city up to the outskirts of the new residential districts in N'Tchengue, where sandy paths with frequent potholes prevail. Traffic jams are common in road junctions such as the Carrefour Tobia or Léon Mba, close to the downtown area. There are plenty of shared taxi services for which the price of a drive is negotiable, starting usually at 400 CFA Francs. The taxi fare usually doubles for night drives. A premium price (doubled fare) is requested for passengers travelling beyond paved roads, given the hardships of the road, lack or non existence of illuminated roads at night, or pedestrians randomly walking on the road. Most of the cars are obsolete given the prohibitively high cost of new imported cars. Furthermore, the lack of local car spareparts manufacturers underscores the need to import such parts from as far as Europe, the increased price as well as the lengthy delivery duration penalize altogether the traffic.

The city has an airport, Port-Gentil International Airport, serving as the main channel of transportation with the world. Regular flights connect it with Libreville, capital of Gabon.

Healthcare
Hospitals within Port-Gentil include:* Clinique Mandji, located in the Littoral district on the Route de la Sobraga,* Clinique du Littoral, located on the Boulevard du Gouverneur Pélieu,* Centre du Traitement Ambulatoire on the road to N'Tchengue.

Education
Schools include:
 École Mixte Port-Gentil or École publique conventionnée de Port-Gentil
 École primaire Léopold Sédar Senghor (French primary school)
 Lycée Français Victor Hugo de Port-Gentil (French secondary school)

Places of worship    
Among the places of worship, they are predominantly Christian churches and temples : Roman Catholic Diocese of Port-Gentil (Catholic Church), Assemblies of God, Evangelical Church of Gabon. There are also Muslim mosques.

Notable residents
Stéphane Lasme, professional basketball player
Alexander N'Doumbou, professional footballer

Gallery

References

Sources
 David E. Gardinier, Historical Dictionary of Gabon, 2nd ed. (The Scarecrow Press, 1994) p. 275–276
 Port Gentil - the world's most expensive city, Time Magazine online, Mar 16 2007

 
Populated places in Ogooué-Maritime Province
Ogooué River
French Equatorial Africa
Port cities and towns in Gabon
Ports and harbours of Gabon